Grewia similis is a species of flowering plant in the family Malvaceae, native to the Democratic Republic of the Congo, eastern Tropical Africa, and Ethiopia. It is the preferred browse species of eastern black rhinoceroses (Diceros bicornis michaeli).

References

similis
Flora of the Democratic Republic of the Congo
Flora of Burundi
Flora of Rwanda
Flora of East Tropical Africa
Flora of Ethiopia
Plants described in 1892